Dendy may refer to:

 Arthur Dendy, English zoologist who worked on the "living fossil" Peripatus
 Edward Stephen Dendy, English officer of arms
 Henry Dendy, founder of Brighton, Melbourne
 Marquis Dendy (born 1992), American long jumper
 C. F. Dendy Marshall (1872–1945), English railway historian
 Dendy, a character on OK K.O.! Let's Be Heroes
 Dendy (console), a Taiwanese clone of Famicom video game console, released by Steepler company and sold mainly in Russia
 Dendy Cinemas, an Australian arthouse cinema chain
 Dendy Films, an arthouse film distributor absorbed into the Australian branch of Icon Productions

See also
 Dandy (disambiguation)

ru:Денди